Mariano is an Italian surname. Notable people with the surname include:

 Belle Mariano, a Filipino actress, singer, and model
 Rob Mariano, an American television personality,

See also
Mariano
Mariano (disambiguation)

References

Italian-language surnames